= Čanići =

Village in Bosnia and Herzegovina

- Village
- Location within Bosnia and Herzegovina
- Coordinates: 44.5954851°N 18.5865694°E
- Country: Bosnia and Herzegovina
- Entity: Federation of Bosnia and Herzegovina
- Canton: Tuzla
- Municipality: Tuzla

Area
  - Total: 2.04 sq mi (5.28 km^{2})

Population (2013)
  - Total: 357
  - Density: 175/sq mi (67.6/km^{2})
- Time zone: UTC+1 (CET)
  - Summer (DST): UTC+2 (CEST)

Čanići is a village in the municipality of Tuzla, Tuzla Canton, Bosnia and Herzegovina.

== Demographics ==
According to the 2013 census, its population was 357.

Ethnicity in 2013
| Ethnicity | Number | Percentage |
|---|---|---|
| Croats | 300 | 84.0% |
| Bosniaks | 50 | 14.0% |
| other/undeclared | 7 | 2.0% |
| Total | 357 | 100% |
